Drenok is a village on Jablanica mountain in Municipality of Struga, North Macedonia.

Demographic history 
Drenok (Dranok) appears in the Ottoman defter of 1467 as a village in the timar of Iskender in the vilayet of Dulgoberda. The settlement had a total of four households and the anthroponymy attested depicts a presence of Albanian personal names alongside Christian names which belong to the Slavic onomastic sphere: Kojo son of Gjini, Simko son of Lolça, Petre brother of Kojo, and Ninec brother of Simko.

Population 
As of the 2021 census, Drenok had 19 residents with the following ethnic composition:
Macedonians 18
Serbs 1

References

Villages in Struga Municipality